Gav Ha'Uma (formerly Matzav Ha'Uma) was an Israeli satire show hosted by Lior Schleien, Orna Banai, Guri Alfi and as of the fourth season also Einav Galili. The show was broadcast from January 4, 2010 until January 15, 2015 on Channel 2 (Reshet) as Matzav Ha'Uma ("מצב האומה", "The state of the nation") and from February 3, 2015 on Channel 10 as Gav Ha'Uma ("גב האומה", "The back of the nation").

Guri Alfi, one of the show's regular panelists, appeared in only a handful of episodes of the 2nd season of Gav Ha'Uma, and departed from the show in favor of hosting his own late-night talk show in Channel 2's Keshet. Recurring panelists participate since then as a replacement.

The show was taken down in August 2020, after the network decided not to sign Lior Schleien for another season, this due to high production cost, and low ratings.

The shows cancellation sparked controversy. This over claims that the shows cancellation was influenced by political interest.

USA performance
The show's team performed in NY at NYU Skirball Center in 2014, with a guest skit involving Joan Rivers.

See also
 Channel 2 (Israel)
 Channel 10 (Israel)
 Reshet
 Nana 10

References

External links

 Official website of Matzav Ha'Uma
 Official website of Gav Ha'Uma
 

2010 Israeli television series debuts
2015 Israeli television series debuts
2020 Israeli television series endings
Israeli television shows
Channel 2 (Israeli TV channel) original programming
Channel 10 (Israeli TV channel) original programming
Channel 13 (Israel) original programming